This page lists philosophers from Canada.

Leslie Armour, Research Professor of Philosophy at Dominican University College, and Emeritus Professor of Philosophy at the University of Ottawa
Vernon J. Bourke (1907-1988), Professor of Philosophy at Saint Louis University
James Robert Brown, Professor of Philosophy at the University of Toronto
Mario Bunge, Frothingham Professor of Logics and Metaphysics at McGill University
David Castle, Professor and Chair of Innovations in the Life Sciences at the University of Edinburgh
Patricia Churchland, UC President's Professor of Philosophy at the University of California, San Diego, adjunct professor at the Salk Institute for Biological Studies
Paul Churchland, Professor Emeritus at the University of California, San Diego
Murray Clarke, Professor of Philosophy at Concordia University
Sharyn Clough, Associate Professor of Philosophy at Oregon State University
Charles Norris Cochrane (1889-1945)
Lorraine Code, Professor Emerita of Philosophy at York University
G.A. Cohen (1941-2009), Chichele Professor of Social and Political Theory, All Souls College, Oxford
Vianney Décarie (1917-2009), Order of Canada, National Order of Quebec
John N. Deck (1921-1979), Professor of Philosophy at the University of Windsor
Richard Fumerton, Professor of Philosophy at the University of Iowa
Ronald de Sousa, Emeritus Professor at the Department of Philosophy of the University of Toronto
James Doull (1918-2001), Professor at Dalhousie University
David Gauthier, Professor Emeritus at the University of Pittsburgh
George Grant (1918-1988), Order of Canada
Dan Goldstick, Professor Emeritus at the University of Toronto
Thomas Anderson Gouge (1910-1999)
Ian Hacking, Professor Emeritus at the University of Toronto, Order of Canada
Cressida Heyes, Professor of Philosophy and Canada Research Chair at the University of Alberta.
Ted Honderich, Grote Professor Emeritus of the Philosophy of Mind and Logic, University College London and Visiting Professor at the University of Bath
Andrew David Irvine, Professor of Philosophy and Mathematics at the University of British Columbia
Grace Jantzen (1948-2006), Professor of Religion, Culture and Gender at Manchester University
Mark Kingwell, Professor of Philosophy at the University of Toronto
Raymond Klibansky (1905-2005), Order of Canada, National Order of Quebec, John Frothingham Emeritus Professor of Logic and Metaphysics at McGill University, honorary fellow of Wolfson College, Oxford
Will Kymlicka, Professor of Philosophy at Queen's University
Bernard Lonergan (1904-1984), Professor of Philosophy
Lou Marinoff, Associate Professor at the City College of New York
Adèle Mercier, Professor of Philosophy at Queen's University
Adam Morton, Professor Emeritus, University of Alberta, visiting emeritus professor, UBC
Jan Narveson, Distinguished Professor Emeritus, University of Waterloo
Kai Nielsen, Adjunct Professor at Concordia University and Professor Emeritus at the University of Calgary
Jay Newman (1948-2007), Professor at the University of Guelph
Calvin Normore, Macdonald Chair of Moral Philosophy at McGill University and Professor of Philosophy at UCLA
Joseph Owens, C.Ss.R., (1908-2005) Pontifical Institute of Mediaeval Studies
John Ralston Saul, Order of Canada
John Russon, Presidential Distinguished Professor at the University of Guelph
David Schmidtz, Professor of Philosophy and Economics at the University of Arizona
William Seager, Professor of Philosophy at the University of Toronto Scarborough
Michel Seymour, Professor of Philosophy at Université de Montréal
Hillel Steiner, Emeritus Professor of Political Philosophy at the University of Manchester
Barry Stroud, Willis S. and Marion Slusser Professor Emeritus of Philosophy at the University of California, Berkeley
L. W. Sumner, Professor Emeritus of Law and Philosophy at the University of Toronto
William Sweet, Professor of Philosophy at St. Francis Xavier University
Charles Taylor, Professor Emeritus at McGill University
John Watson (1847-1939), Chair of Logic, Metaphysics, and Ethics at Queen's University
Alison Wylie, Professor of Philosophy at the University of British Columbia
Duane Rousselle, Assistant Professor of Sociology at Nipissing University

See also
Philosophy in Canada

Canadian
Philosophers